Ukaliqtuuq formerly Okolli Island is one of the Canadian arctic islands located in Hudson Strait, Nunavut, Canada. It is a Baffin Island offshore island in Qikiqtaaluk Region.

References

Islands of Baffin Island
Islands of Hudson Strait
Uninhabited islands of Qikiqtaaluk Region